Mark Ricks (born December 16, 1970) is a former American football defensive back who played ten seasons in the Arena Football League with the St. Louis Stampede, Nashville Kats, Portland Forest Dragons, Portland Forest Dragons/Oklahoma Wranglers, Los Angeles Avengers, Arizona Rattlers, Grand Rapids Rampage and New York Dragons. He played college football at Western Michigan University. He was also a member of the Saskatchewan Roughriders, Toronto Argonauts, Winnipeg Blue Bombers and Ottawa Rough Riders of the Canadian Football League.

Professional career

Saskatchewan Roughriders
Ricks played for the Saskatchewan Roughriders in 1993.

Toronto Argonauts
Ricks played for the Toronto Argonauts in 1993.

Saskatchewan Roughriders
Ricks was a member of the Saskatchewan Roughriders during the 1994 off-season. He released by the Roughriders on July 2, 1994.

Winnipeg Blue Bombers
Ricks played for the Winnipeg Blue Bombers in 1995.

Ottawa Rough Riders
Ricks was signed by the Ottawa Rough Riders on July 31, 1995.

St. Louis Stampede
Ricks played for the St. Louis Stampede in 1996.

Nashville Kats
Ricks played for the Nashville Kats in 1997.

Portland Forest Dragons/Oklahoma Wranglers
Ricks played for the Portland Forest Dragons/Oklahoma Wranglers from 1998 to 2000, earning Second Team All-Arena honors in 1999. The Forest Dragons relocated to Oklahoma for the 2000 season.

Los Angeles Avengers
Ricks was signed by the Los Angeles Avengers on November 2, 2000. He earned First Team All-Arena honors in 2001. He was released by the Avengers on December 11, 2002.

Arizona Rattlers
Ricks signed with the Arizona Rattlers on December 31, 2002. He was released by the Rattlers on March 11, 2003.

Grand Rapids Rampage
Ricks played for the Grand Rapids Rampage from 2003 to 2004.

New York Dragons
Ricks was signed by the New York Dragons on March 7, 2006.

References

External links
Just Sports Stats

Living people
1970 births
Players of American football from Los Angeles
American football defensive backs
Canadian football defensive backs
American players of Canadian football
Western Michigan Broncos football players
Saskatchewan Roughriders players
Toronto Argonauts players
Winnipeg Blue Bombers players
Ottawa Rough Riders players
St. Louis Stampede players
Nashville Kats players
Portland Forest Dragons players
Oklahoma Wranglers players
Los Angeles Avengers players
Arizona Rattlers players
Grand Rapids Rampage players
New York Dragons players
Players of Canadian football from Los Angeles